Since 1999, 55 Cuban football players have defected to the United States in an attempt to further their professional career or improve their standard of living.

Under the old wet feet, dry feet policy in the United States, any Cuban player who set foot in the United States was entitled to become a US resident. Maykel Galindo, one of the earlier defectors told of the incentives to leave Cuba: "They leave Cuba because they want to make something out of their lives.  They are in search of the dream of playing football at a professional level and they know that Cuba will not offer them that. They do it because they feel that their family will be proud of them if they make it to the professional level and many of those players have realized that they can achieve that goal. Thankfully, in my case, doors were being opened to me." The wet feet, dry feet policy ended in January 2017.

As a general rule, Cuban players who defect are not allowed to rejoin the Cuba national team for international matches. Players who defect are generally ineligible to play for the  United States team, as FIFA eligibility rules only allow a player to play for one national team during his career.

Year

1999

Rodney Valdes defected to the United States during the 1999 Pan-American Games football tournament in Winnipeg, Canada.

Rodney Valdes (goalkeeper) - Cuban U23 international

2002

Rey Ángel Martínez and Alberto Delgado defected during the 2002 CONCACAF Gold Cup. They told Cuba national football team minders that they were going to make a phone call in the hotel lobby but ran out of the hotel and traveled in a taxi to Martinez's uncle.

Rey Ángel Martínez
Alberto Delgado

2005

Cuban international forward Maykel Galindo sought to stay in the United States after he had arrived in the country with the Cuba national team for the 2005 CONCACAF Gold Cup.

Maykel Galindo

2007

Inspired by Galindo, two players defected at the following Gold Cup, two years later.

Osvaldo Alonso
Lester Moré

2008

Several Cuban youth players defected in 2008 following an Olympic qualifier hosted in the United States.

 Yeniel Bermudez - Cuban U23 international
 José Miranda (goalkeeper) - Cuban U23 international
 Erlys García - Cuban U23 international
 Yordany Alvarez (midfielder) - Cuban U23 international
 Loanny Cartaya (defender) - Cuban U23 international
 Yendry Diaz - Cuban U23 international
 Eder Roldán - Cuban U23 international

2010

Two players defected during a 2010 World Cup qualifier.

Pedro Faife
Reynier Alcantara

2011

Yosniel Mesa defected during the 2011 CONCACAF Gold Cup

Yosniel Mesa - Cuban international

2012 

Yosmel de Armas defected in 2012 during Cuba's qualifying campaign for the 2012 Olympics.

Yosmel de Armas Cuban U23 international (he signed for Laredo Heat in 2013 )

Prior to a World Cup qualifying game against Canada in Toronto, four players and the team's psychologist Ignacio Abreu Sánchez defected to the United States.  Cuba were not able to name any substitutes due to the defections.

Reysander Fernández (midfielder from Ciego de Ávila)
Heviel Cordoves (forward, aged 23 from Havana)
Maikel Chang (forward, aged 21 from Havana)
Odisnel Cooper (goalkeeper, aged 20 from Camagüey)

Two players defected during the 2012 CONCACAF Women's Olympic Qualifying Tournament which was hosted in Vancouver, Canada.

Yezenia Gallardo (forward, aged 20)
Yisel Rodríguez (midfielder, aged 22)

2015
Four players defected during the 2015 CONCACAF Gold Cup.

Keiler García (forward, aged 25 from FC Camagüey)
Arael Argüellez (goalkeeper, aged 28 from FC Cienfuegos)
Darío Suárez (midfielder, aged 22 from FC La Habana)
Ariel Martínez (midfielder, aged 29 from FC Sancti Spiritus)

Another six defected during the 2015 CONCACAF Men's Olympic Qualifying Championship:

Emmanuel Labrada (midfielder, aged 21 from CF Granma)
Dairon Pérez (midfielder, aged 20 from FC La Habana)
Frank López García (forward, aged 20 from FC Cienfuegos)
Yendry Torres (defender, aged 19 from FC Cienfuegos)
Brian Rosales (defender, aged 20 from FC Matanzas)
Pedro Anderson (midfielder, aged 21 from FC Pinar del Río)
One player defected during a personal visit:
Jorge Luis Corrales (defender, aged 24, from FC Pinar del Río)

One player defected having visited Mexico:
Héctor Morales (attacker, aged 21 from FC La Habana)
Jonathan Moliner (defender, aged 19 from FC Cienfuegos) also defected.

2018
Twelve players defected following the 2018 CONCACAF U-20 Championship which was hosted in Bradenton, Florida.

 Arturo Hector Godoy
 Bruno Manuel Rendon Cardoso
 Christopher Yoel Llorente Fernandez
 Danny Echeverria Diaz
 Frank Leidam Nodarse Chavez
 Geobel Pérez
 Josue Vega Alvarez
 Juan Manuel Andreus Milanes
 Omar Perez Ramirez
 Omar Proenza Calderon
 Rivaldo Ibarra Thompson
 Rolando Aldahir Oviendo Valdez
 Yandri Romero Clark

Two players defected during the 2018 CONCACAF Women's Championship which was hosted in Edinburg, Texas.

Yenifer Ramos (midfielder, aged 19)
Francis Riquelme (forward, aged 20)

2019
Four players defected during the 2019 CONCACAF Gold Cup.

The following player defected after the match against Mexico
 Yasmany López (midfielder, aged 31 from Ciego de Ávila)

The following players defected after the match against Martinique
 Luismel Morris (midfielder, aged 21 from FC Camagüey)
 Reynaldo Pérez (midfielder, aged 25 from Delfines del Este FC, Dominican Republic)
 Daniel Luis Sáez  (midfielder, aged 25 from Delfines del Este FC, Dominican Republic)

See also
 List of baseball players who defected from Cuba

References 

Soccer
Cuban
Cuban soccer players to the United States
Cuban soccer players who have defected
Cuban
Cuba–United States relations
Association football player non-biographical articles